Brendan Percival Hansen  (21 August 1922 – 19 December 1999) was an Australian politician. He served as Member for Wide Bay in the Federal Parliament from 1961 to 1974 and as Member for Maryborough in the Queensland Parliament from 1977 to 1983, representing the Australian Labor Party (ALP).

Early life
Brendan Percival Hansen was born on 21 August 1922 in Maryborough, Queensland, the eldest son of Percy Hansen and Mary Ann (née Rowley).

His father, a shipwright by trade, had been Secretary of the Shipwrights Union in Brisbane and Maryborough, and was involved in the founding of the Queensland Council of Unions.

Hansen was educated at the Granville State School and Christian Brothers College, Maryborough before becoming a shipwright and loftsman at the Walkers Limited shipyard. He joined the Labor Party in 1950 and served as Secretary of the Granville branch of the ALP.

Politics

Hansen served as President of the Maryborough sub-branch of the Federated Shipwrights and Ship Constructors Association and as an alderman on Maryborough City Council before entering federal politics. In 1958, he ran for the Australian House of Representatives as the Labor candidate for Wide Bay, losing to Country Party candidate Henry Bandidt.  However, he sought a rematch against Bandidt in 1961 and won. It was the first time Labor had won the seat, once held by former Labor leader Andrew Fisher, since 1915.

After the Whitlam Government was elected in 1972 he acted as government whip until 1974, when he was defeated by Country Party's Clarrie Millar. Hansen ran against Millar again in 1975, but was heavily defeated. In 1977, he was elected to the Legislative Assembly of Queensland as the member for Maryborough, a position he held until 1983.

Death
Hansen died in 1999, aged 77, and, in January 2001, his award of the Medal of the Order of Australia was posthumously announced, with the citation "For service to the community of Maryborough, particularly through the Maryborough and District Housing Action group and the Scouting movement". He is buried in the Maryborough Cemetery.

Legacy
Hansen was honored with a park in his name in Granville and a government building, the Brendan Hansen Building, in Hervey Bay.

Family
Brendan Hansen married Moira O'Sullivan in 1960 at St Mary's Catholic Church, Maryborough. Moira Hansen is a light opera singer who still remains active in the city's arts community. They had eight children, including Mary Hansen (1966–2002), a singer/musician for the British band, Stereolab.

References

1922 births
1999 deaths
Australian Labor Party members of the Parliament of Australia
Australian people of Irish descent
Members of the Australian House of Representatives for Wide Bay
Members of the Australian House of Representatives
Members of the Queensland Legislative Assembly
Recipients of the Medal of the Order of Australia
People from Maryborough, Queensland
Australian shipwrights
20th-century Australian politicians